Piedras is a town and municipality in the Tolima department of Colombia.  The population of the municipality was 4,421 as of the 1993 census. asdfghjkitrewserytxcygvubiojpk[oi0u9ydtfs67tuj

Municipalities of Tolima Department